Taivoan or Taivuan, is a Formosan language spoken until the end of the 19th century by the indigenous Taivoan people of Taiwan. Taivoan used to be regarded as a dialect of Siraya, but now more evidence has shown that they should be classified as separate languages. The corpora previously regarded as Siraya like the Gospel of St. Matthew and the Notes on Formulary of Christianity translated into "Siraya" by the Dutch people in the 17th century should be in Taivoan majorly.

Since the January 2019 code release, SIL International has recognized Taivoan as an independent language and assigned the code tvx.

Classification 
The Taivoan language used to be regarded as a dialect of Siraya. However, more evidences have shown that it belongs to an independent language spoken by the Taivoan people.

Documentary evidence 
In "De Dagregisters van het Kasteel Zeelandia" written by the Dutch colonizers during 1629–1662, it was clearly said that when the Dutch people would like to speak to the chieftain of Cannacannavo (Kanakanavu), they needed to translate from Dutch to Sinckan (Siraya), from Sinckan to Tarroequan (possibly a Paiwan or a Rukai language), from Tarroequan to Taivoan, and from Taivoan to Cannacannavo."...... in Cannacannavo: Aloelavaos tot welcken de vertolckinge in Sinccans, Tarrocquans en Tevorangs geschiede, weder voor een jaer aengenomen" — "De Dagregisters van het Kasteel Zeelandia", pp.6–8

Linguistic evidence 
A comparison of numerals of Siraya, Taivoan (Tevorangh dialect), and Makatao (Kanapo dialect) with Proto-Austronesian language show the difference among the three Austronesian languages in southwestern Taiwan in the early 20th century:

In 2009,  further proved the relationship among the three languages, based on the latest linguistic observations below:

Some examples include:

Based on the discovery, Li attempted two classification trees:

1. Tree based on the number of phonological innovations
 Sirayaic
 Taivoan
 Siraya–Makatao
 Siraya
 Makatao

2. Tree based on the relative chronology of sound changes
 Sirayaic
 Siraya
 Taivoan–Makatao
 Taivoan
 Makatao

Li (2009) considers the second tree (the one containing the Taivoan–Makatao group) to be the somewhat more likely one.

Criticism against Candidius' famous assertion 
Taivoan was considered by some scholars as a dialectal subgroup of the Siraya ever since George Candidius included "Tefurang" in the eight Siraya villages which he claimed all had "the same manners, customs and religion, and speak the same language." However,  American linguist Raleigh Ferrell reexaminates the Dutch materials and says "it appear that the Tevorangians were a distinct ethnolinguistic group, differing markedly in both language and culture from the Siraya." Ferrell mentions that, given that Candidius asserted that he was well familiar with the eight supposed Siraya villages including Tevorang, it's extremely doubtful that he ever actually visited the latter: "it is almost certain, in any case, that he had not visited Tevorang when he wrote his famous account in 1628. The first Dutch visit to Tevorang appears to have been in January 1636 [...]"

Lee (2015) regards that, when Siraya was a lingua franca among at least eight indigenous communities in southwestern Taiwan plain, Taivoan people from Tevorangh, who has been proved to have their own language in "De Dagregisters van het Kasteel Zeelandia", might still need the translation service from Wanli, a neighbor community that shared common hunting field and also a militarily alliance with Tevorangh.

Li noted in his "The Lingue Franche in Taiwan" that, Siraya exerted its influence over neighbouring languages in the southwestern plains in Taiwan, including Taivoan to the east and Makatao to the South in the 17th century, and became lingua franca in the whole area.

Phonology 
The following is the phonology of the language:

Vowels

Consonants 

It's likely that there were no /g/, /ts/, and /tsʰ/ in the 17th–19th century Taivoan, although Adelaar claims c preceding i or y be sibilant or affricate and so could be /ts/ or /ʃ/. However, the three sounds appeared after the 20th century, especially in Tevorangh dialect in Siaolin, Alikuan, and Dazhuang, and also in some words in Vogavon dialect in Lakku, for example:

 /g/: agang /a'gaŋ (crab), ahagang /aha'gaŋ/ or agaga' /aga'ga?/ (red), gupi /gu'pi/  (Jasminum nervosum Lour.), Anag /a'nag/ (the Taivoan Highest Ancestral Spirit), kogitanta agisen /kogitan'ta agi'sən/ (the Taivoan ceremonial tool to worship the Highest Ancestral Spirits), magun /ma'gun/ (cold), and agicin /agit͡sin/ or agisen /agisən/ (bamboo fishing trap).
 /t͡s/: icikang /it͡si'kaŋ/ (fish), vawciw /vaw't͡siw/ (Hibiscus taiwanensis Hu), cawla /t͡saw'la/ (Lysimachia capillipes Hemsl.), ciwla /t͡siw'la/ (Clausena excavata Burm. f.), and agicin /agit͡sin/ (bamboo fishing trap). The sound also clearly appears in a recording of the typical Taivoan ceremonial song "Kalawahe" sung by Taivoan in Lakku that belongs to Vogavon dialect.

The digraph ts recorded in the early 20th century may represent /t͡sʰ/ or /t͡s/:

 /t͡sʰ/ or /t͡s/: matsa (door, gate), tabutsuk (spear), tsakitsak (arrow), matsihaha (to laugh), tsukun (elbow), atsipi (a sole of the foot), tsau (dog). Only one word is attested in Vogavon dialect in Lakku: katsui (pants, trousers).

Some scholar in Formosan languages suggest it's not likely that /t͡sʰ/ and /t͡s/ appear in a Formosan language simultaneously, and therefore ts may well represent /t͡s/ as c does, not /t͡sʰ/.

Stress 
It's hard to tell the actual stressing system of Taivoan in the 17th–19th century, as it's been a dormant language for nearly a hundred years. However, since nearly all the existing Taivoan words but the numerals pronounced by the elders fall on the final syllable, there has been a tendency to stress on the final syllable in modern Taivoan for language revitalization and education, compared to modern Siraya that the penultimate syllable is stressed.

Grammar

Pronouns 
The Taivoan personal pronouns are listed below with all the words without asterisk being attested in corpora in the 20th century :

Numerals 
Taivoan has a decimal numeral system as following:

Examples

Words and phrases 

Some Taivoan people in remote communities like Siaolin, Alikuan, Laolong, Fangliao, and Dazhuang, especially the elders, still use some Taivoan words nowadays, such as miunun "welcome" (originally "please be seated"), mahanru (in Siaolin, Alikuan), makahanru (in Laolong) "thank you", "goodbye" (originally "beautiful"), tapakua "wait a moment".

Songs 
Many Taivoan songs have been recorded and some ceremonial songs like "Kalawahe" and "Taboro" are still been sung during every Night Ceremony annually. Some examples are:

Kalawahe (or "the Song out of the Shrine")

 Wa-he. Manie, he mahanru e, he kalawahe, wa-he.
 Talaloma e, he talaloma e, he kalawahe, wa-he.
 Tamaku e, he tamaku e, he kalawahe, wa-he.
 Saviki e, he saviki e, he kalawahe, wa-he.
 Rarom he, he rarom he, he kalawahe, wa-he.

Panga (or "the Song of Offerings") 

 Ho i he, rarom mahanru ho i he, rarom taipanga ho i he.
 Ho i he, hahu mahanru ho i he, hahu taipanga ho i he.
 Ho i he, hana mahanru ho i he, hana taipanga ho i he.
 Ho i he, saviki mahanru ho i he, saviki taipanga ho i he.
 Ho i he, iruku mahanru ho i he, tuku taipanga ho i he.

See also 
 Taivoan people
 Sinckan Manuscripts

Notes

References

Formosan languages
Taivoan people
Extinct languages of Asia
Languages extinct in the 19th century